Eurolophosaurus amathites, the Amathites lava lizard, is a species of South American lava lizard in the family Tropiduridae. The species is endemic to Brazil.

References

Eurolophosaurus
Lizards of South America
Endemic fauna of Brazil
Reptiles of Brazil
Reptiles described in 1984
Taxa named by Miguel Trefaut Rodrigues